Balonmano Ciudad Real was a Spanish handball team based in Ciudad Real, Castilla La Mancha. BM Ciudad Real plays in Liga ASOBAL.

History
In July 1983 is founded in the city of Ciudad Real a handball club named Asociación Deportiva Cultural Caserío Vigón. In 1993, other Ciudad Real-based team, Asociación Deportiva Cultural Ciudad Real purchase the rights of ADC Caserío Vigón and renames the team as Balonmano Ciudad Real

Relocation
In 2011, BM Ciudad Real was relocated to Madrid under the new name BM Atlético de Madrid. It was finally dissolved two years later.

Club names
Agrupación Deportiva Cultural Caserio Vigón – (1983–1993)
Agrupación Deportiva Cultural Ciudad Real – (1993–2011)

Trophies
Liga ASOBAL: 5
Winners: 2003–04, 2006–07, 2007–08, 2008–09 & 2009–10
Runners-Up: 2002–03
EHF Champions League: 3
Winners: 2005–06, 2007–08, 2008–09.
Runners-Up: 2004–05, 2010–11
EHF Men's Champions Trophy: 3
Winners: 2005, 2006 and 2008
EHF Challenge Cup
Runners-Up: 1998–99
Copa del Rey: 3
Winners: 2003, 2008 & 2011
Runners-Up: 2001, 2002, 2004, 2006
ASOBAL Cup: 6
Winners: 2004, 2005, 2006, 2007, 2008 & 2011
Supercopa ASOBAL: 3
Winners:  2005, 2008 & 2011
Runners-Up: 2004
City Cup
Runners-Up: 1999
EHF Cup Winner's Cup: 2
Winners: 2002, 2003
IHF Super Globe: 2
Winners: 2007, 2010
Runners-Up: 2011
Double: 1
Winners: 2007–08

Statistics 2010/11

Stadium information
Name: – Quijote Arena
City: – Ciudad Real
Capacity: – 5,200
Address: – Polígono Industrial Larache.

Notable coaches
Veselin Vujović
Talant Duyshebaev

Famous players

 José Javier Hombrados
 Jordi Núñez
 Antonio Muñoz Villanueva
 Santi Urdiales
 Angel Hermida
 Javier Valenzuela
 Xabier Mikel Rekondo
 Talant Duyshebaev
 Mirza Džomba
 Ólafur Stefánsson
 Iker Romero
 Julen Aguinagalde
 Petar Metličić
 Joan Cañellas
 Uroš Zorman
 Hussein Zaky
 Aleš Pajovič
 Gheorghe Covaciu
 Didier Dinart
 Jonas Källman
 David Davis
 Alberto Entrerríos
/ Siarhei Rutenka
 Kiril Lazarov
 Isaías Guardiola
 Mariusz Jurkiewicz
 Eric Gull
 Chema Rodríguez
 Luc Abalo
 Jérôme Fernandez
/ Rolando Uríos
  Senjanin Maglajlija
/ Julio Fis
 Torsten Laen
 Claus Møller Jakobsen
 Sergey Pogorelov
 Christian Hjermind
/ Arpad Šterbik
 Viran Morros
 Egor Evdokimov

References

External links

 BM Ciudad Real Official Website
 Documentacion para entrenadores de Balonmano
 Revista digital de la Liga Asobal Balonmano

Spanish handball clubs
Sports teams in Castilla–La Mancha
Handball clubs established in 1983
Sports clubs disestablished in 2011
Defunct handball clubs
Sport in Ciudad Real
1983 establishments in Spain
2011 disestablishments in Spain